This article contains lists of achievements in major senior-level international association football, futsal and beach soccer tournaments according to first-place, second-place and third-place results obtained by teams representing different nations. The objective is not to create combined medal tables; the focus is on listing the best positions achieved by teams in major international tournaments, ranking the nations according to the most number of podiums accomplished by teams of these nations.

Results 
For the making of these lists, results from following major international tournaments were consulted:

 FIFA: Fédération Internationale de Football Association
 IOC: International Olympic Committee

Medals earned by athletes from defunct National Olympic Committees (NOCs) or historical teams are NOT merged with the results achieved by their immediate successor states. The International Olympic Committee (IOC) does NOT combine medals of these nations or teams.

The tables are pre-sorted by total number of first-place results, second-place results and third-place results, respectively. When equal ranks are given, nations are listed in alphabetical order.

Association football, futsal and beach soccer

Men and women 

*Defunct National Olympic Committees (NOCs) or historical teams are shown in italic.
†FIFA affiliates and non International Olympic Committee (IOC) members.
‡International Olympic Committee (IOC) members and non FIFA affiliates.

Men 

*Defunct National Olympic Committees (NOCs) or historical teams are shown in italic.
†FIFA affiliates and non International Olympic Committee (IOC) members.
‡International Olympic Committee (IOC) members and non FIFA affiliates.

Association football

Men and women 

*Defunct National Olympic Committees (NOCs) or historical teams are shown in italic.
†FIFA affiliates and non International Olympic Committee (IOC) members.
‡International Olympic Committee (IOC) members and non FIFA affiliates.

Men 

*Defunct National Olympic Committees (NOCs) or historical teams are shown in italic.
†FIFA affiliates and non International Olympic Committee (IOC) members.
‡International Olympic Committee (IOC) members and non FIFA affiliates.

Women 

†FIFA affiliates and non International Olympic Committee (IOC) members.

Futsal

Beach soccer 

†FIFA affiliates and non International Olympic Committee (IOC) members.

See also 
 FIFA World Rankings
 FIFA Women's World Rankings
 Major achievements in Olympic team ball sports by nation
 List of major achievements in sports by nation

References

General 
Official results
 Association football
 Men's Olympic Football Tournament: Archive, Statistics
 Women's Olympic Football Tournament: Archive, Statistics
 FIFA World Cup: Archive, Statistics
 FIFA Women's World Cup: Archive, Statistics
 FIFA Confederations Cup: Archive, Statistics
 Futsal
 FIFA Futsal World Cup: Archive, Statistics
 Beach soccer
 FIFA Beach Soccer World Cup: Archive, Statistics

Specific

External links 
 Fédération Internationale de Football Association (FIFA)

Association football
Achievements
International association football competition records and statistics
Achievements